Groove Masters is a semi-private recording studio owned by Jackson Browne. Located in Santa Monica, California, the studio has been the setting for many of Browne's recordings. The head sound engineer is Grammy-nominated Paul Dieter. The studio occasionally opens its doors to old friends, such as David Crosby, as well as new independent artists.

Albums recorded
By Jackson Browne unless stated.
I'm Alive (1993)
The Naked Ride Home (2002)
Solo Acoustic, Vol. 1 (2005)
Solo Acoustic, Vol. 2 (2008)
 Bob Dylan, Together Through Life (2009)
 New Found Glory, Coming Home (2006)
 Bob Dylan, Tempest (2012)
 David Crosby, Lighthouse (2016)
 Megan Keely, Bloom (2018)

References

Recording studios in California
Buildings and structures in Santa Monica, California
Jackson Browne